In Greek mythology, Ilus is the name of several mythological persons associated directly or indirectly with Troy.
 Ilus, the son of Dardanus, and the legendary founder of Dardania.
Ilus, the son of Tros, and the legendary founder of Troy.
 Ilus, son of Mermerus, and grandson of Jason and Medea. This Ilus lived at Ephyra, between Elis and Olympia. In a tale recounted in The Odyssey, he played host to Odysseus, but when Odysseus requested from Ilus poison for his arrows, he declined, from fear of divine vengeance.
 Ilus, an ally of Turnus, the man who opposed Aeneas in Italy.

Ilus means "beautiful" in Estonian language.

Notes

References 

 Homer, The Iliad with an English Translation by A.T. Murray, Ph.D. in two volumes. Cambridge, MA., Harvard University Press; London, William Heinemann, Ltd. 1924. Online version at the Perseus Digital Library.
 Homer, Homeri Opera in five volumes. Oxford, Oxford University Press. 1920. Greek text available at the Perseus Digital Library.
 Pseudo-Apollodorus, The Library with an English Translation by Sir James George Frazer, F.B.A., F.R.S. in 2 Volumes, Cambridge, MA, Harvard University Press; London, William Heinemann Ltd. 1921. Online version at the Perseus Digital Library. Greek text available from the same website.
 Publius Vergilius Maro, Aeneid. Theodore C. Williams. trans. Boston. Houghton Mifflin Co. 1910. Online version at the Perseus Digital Library.
 Publius Vergilius Maro, Bucolics, Aeneid, and Georgics. J. B. Greenough. Boston. Ginn & Co. 1900. Latin text available at the Perseus Digital Library.

Characters in Book VI of the Aeneid
Characters in the Odyssey